Rif Hutton (born November 28, 1962) is an American actor. He is perhaps best known for his recurring role as Dr. Ron Welch in the comedy-drama series Doogie Howser, M.D., appearing in that series from 1990 up to its conclusion in 1993. From 1997 to 2001, he appeared in a recurring role as Lt. Cmdr. Alan Mattoni on the series JAG. Hutton is also notable for playing Russ Beeler, a fictional owner of a KFC establishment, appearing in a number of KFC commercials in the early to mid 1990s.

Life and career
Hutton was born in San Antonio, Texas, and was raised in East Orange, New Jersey. He moved to Los Angeles in the mid-1970s to pursue an acting career. He went to many auditions in his early years, but soon found himself broke and homeless, getting assistance from friends.

Hutton went on to guest star in a number of notable television series including The Jeffersons, Night Court, L.A. Law, Married... with Children, Hunter, Wings, Murphy Brown, The Larry Sanders Show, Getting By, Lois & Clark: The New Adventures of Superman, Family Matters, and Cold Case among others.

Hutton also appeared in stage productions in the Los Angeles area as well as working as a voice actor.

Personal life
Hutton has been married twice. His first marriage was to a woman named Pat, an actress and stand-up comedian. His second was to actress Bridget Hoffman in 2001.

It is also reported in 2000 that he was engaged to actress Telma Hopkins. In 1993–94, Hutton had played Hopkins' love interest in a few episodes of her sitcom Getting By.

Filmography

Film
 Wavelength (1983) - Air Force officer
 Wanted: Dead or Alive (1987) - Agent
 You Talkin' to Me? (1987) - Black Man
 Moving (1988) - Reporter
 Stand and Deliver (1988) - Pearson
 L.A. Heat (1989) - Det. Royster
 The Borrower (1991) - Newscaster
 Going Under (1991) - Dr. Friendly
 Star Trek Generations (1994) - Klingon Guard
 Bigfoot: The Unforgettable Encounter (1995) - Jess
 Children of the Corn III: Urban Harvest (1995) - Arnold
 Restraining Order (1999) - Sidney Evans
 The Thirteenth Floor (1999) - Joe
 Shrek (2001) - Load Farquaad's Guards (voice)
 Osmosis Jones (2001) - Charlie (voice)
 Gas (2004) - Brad
 Shark Tale (2004) - Fish (voice)
 Tugger: The Jeep 4x4 Who Wanted to Fly (2005) - Crewman #1 (voice)
 Madagascar (2005) - Crowd Member (voice)
 Stick It (2006) - Drill Sergeant
 Curious George (2006) - Mailman (voice)
 The Tale of Despereaux (2008) - Man in crowd (voice)
 My Apocalypse (2008) - Housing Inspector
 Astro Boy (2009) - Metro City Sergeant (voice)
 The Princess and the Frog (2009) - DJ (voice)
 Rio (2011) - Additional Voices (voice)
 Hotel Transylvania (2012) - Additional Voices (voice)
 ParaNorman (2012) - Blithe Hollow Townperson (voice)
 Epic (2013) - Additional Voices (voice)
 Rio 2 (2014) - Additional Voices (voice)
 Ice Age: Collision Course (2016) - Additional Voices (voice)
 Kingsglaive: Final Fantasy XV (2016) - High Official #2 (voice)
 The Star (2017) - Additional Voices (voice)
 Spider-Man: Into the Spider-Verse (2018) - Additional Voices (voice)
 Hotel Transylvania 3: Summer Vacation (2018) - Additional Voices (voice)
 The Angry Birds Movie 2 (2019) - Additional Voices (voice)
 Paws of Fury: The Legend of Hank (2022) - Additional Voices (voice)

Television
 The Jeffersons (1985) - Roulette Spinner
 227 (1987) - Man #1
 Webster (1989) - Bob
 A Different World (1989) - Security #2
 Doogie Howser, M.D. (1989-1993) - Dr. Ron Welch
 Married, with Children (1990) - Bailiff
 Wings (1991) - T.V. Anchorman
 Sister, Sister (1994) - PTA President
 Home Improvement (1995) - Man at Arena
 The Wayans Bros. (1995-1999) - Ted Winters / Agent Doug Steckler
 The Jamie Foxx Show (1996) - Vray Beaujay
 Family Matters (1997) - Reverend Fuller
 Seinfeld (1998) - Salesman
 House (2005) - Morris
 Thats So Raven (2005) - Reverend Mattson
 CSI: Crime Scene Investigation (2007) - Vernon Porter
 Ghost Whisperer (2008) - Bill Eritt
 The Mentalist (2008) - Doctor
 Criminal Minds (2016) - Warden Bryan Nabb
 General Hospital (2021) - Lenny

References

External links

1962 births
Living people
20th-century American male actors
21st-century American male actors
Male actors from Texas
Male actors from New Jersey
African-American male actors
American male film actors
American male stage actors
American male television actors
American male voice actors
Actors from East Orange, New Jersey
Male actors from San Antonio
20th-century African-American people
21st-century African-American people